Bø is a village in Bø Municipality in Nordland county, Norway.  The village is located on the southwest shore of the large island of Langøya, looking out towards the small island of Litløya.  Norwegian County Road 820 runs through the village. The village of Bø is made up of three smaller villages that have grown together: Vinje, Steine, and Skagan.  Bø Church stands just east of the village.

References

Villages in Nordland
Bø, Nordland
Populated places of Arctic Norway